Ocys is a genus of ground beetles in the family Carabidae. There are at least 30 described species in Ocys.

Species
These 30 species belong to the genus Ocys:

 Ocys agostii Magrini & Petruzziello, 2018  (Italy)
 Ocys andreae (Jeannel, 1937)  (Spain)
 Ocys angelae Magrini & Vigna Taglianti, 2006  (Italy)
 Ocys beatricis Magrini; Cecchi & Lo Cascio, 1998  (Italy)
 Ocys bedeli (Peyerimhoff, 1908)  (Algeria)
 Ocys berbecum Magrini & Degiovanni, 2009  (Sardinia and Italy)
 Ocys crypticola Jeanne, 2000  (Spain)
 Ocys davatchii Ledoux, 1975  (Iran)
 Ocys elbursensis Morvan, 1974  (Iran)
 Ocys gubellinii Magrini & Vigna Taglianti, 2006  (Italy)
 Ocys harpaloides (Audinet-Serville, 1821)  (Europe and Africa)
 Ocys hiekei Toledano & Wrase, 2016  (China)
 Ocys hoffmanni (Netolitzky, 1917)  (Croatia)
 Ocys inguscioi Magrini & Vanni, 1992  (Italy)
 Ocys ledouxi Morvan, 1974  (Iran)
 Ocys monzinii Magrini & Vigna Taglianti, 2006  (Italy)
 Ocys pecoudi Colas, 1957  (Greece)
 Ocys pennisii Magrini & Vanni, 1989  (Italy)
 Ocys peyerimhoffi (Paulian & Villiers, 1939)  (Morocco)
 Ocys phoceus Giachino & Vailati, 2012  (Greece)
 Ocys pravei (Lutshnik, 1926)  (Georgia, Armenia, and Azerbaijan)
 Ocys pseudopaphius Reitter, 1902  (Ukraine)
 Ocys quinquestriatus (Gyllenhal, 1810)  (Europe and temperate Asia)
 Ocys reticulatus (Netolitzky, 1917)  (worldwide)
 Ocys reuteri Toledano & Wrase, 2016  (Iraq)
 Ocys rotundipennis C.Huber & Marggi, 2001  (Greece)
 Ocys soleymanensis Morvan, 1974  (Iran)
 Ocys tachysoides (Antoine, 1933)  (Europe and Africa)
 Ocys tassii Vigna Taglianti, 1995  (Italy)
 Ocys trechoides Reitter, 1895  (Armenia)

References